Manuel Ortiz de Zárate Pinto (October 9, 1887 – October 28, 1946) was a Chilean painter, born in Italy and raised in Chile. He was active from 1902 to 1945, in Paris and in Italy.

Biography 
Born as Manuel Revuelta Ortiz de Zárate Pinto in Como, Italy. He came from an old Castilian family from Province of Ávila, the son of composer, Eleodoro Ortiz de Zárate and of Matilde Pinto Benavente. He was the younger brother of painter, Julio Ortiz de Zárate. His maternal grandfather was Aníbal Pinto, the Chilean President. He was four years old when the family moved back to Chile. He went on to study painting with Pedro Lira, before entering the Escuela de Bellas Artes (Academy of Fine Arts) in Santiago.

At age 15, he fled home and stowed away on a ship to Italy. He studied painting in Rome, before being drawn to the burgeoning art scene in France, he made his way to Paris. There, he became part of the growing gathering of artists in the Montparnasse Quarter, making friends with Amedeo Modigliani, Pablo Picasso, Léonard Foujita, and some of the other future greats of the art world.

Manuel Ortiz de Zárate studied at the École des Beaux-Arts in Paris, developing his modernist skills in the painting of still lifes and landscapes. In 1916, he became Picasso's art assistant. Between 1920 until 1940, Ortiz de Zárate showed his work at the Salon d’Automne, an annual art exhibition in Paris, France. Together with Camilo Mori and other artists from Chile, Manuel Ortiz de Zárate helped found the Grupo Montparnasse. During World War II, he remained in France despite the German occupation. After the war, he went to the United States where he died in 1946 in Los Angeles, California.

His daughter Laure Ortiz de Zárate was a costume designer and her first husband was the American abstract painter, John Ferren from 1932 until 1938; her second husband was the Russian-born production designer Eugène Lourié from 1941 until 1991.

References

1887 births
1946 deaths
Modern painters
19th-century Chilean painters
19th-century Chilean male artists
Chilean male artists
19th-century Spanish male artists
20th-century Chilean painters
20th-century Spanish male artists
Chilean male painters
19th-century Spanish painters
20th-century Spanish painters
Male painters
20th-century Chilean male artists